Andrew Price Morgan (27 October 1836 – 19 October 1907) was an American debater. He investigated the flora of the Miami Valley in Ohio. While his interest included flowering plants, as noted by his Flora of the Miami Valley, Ohio, his special interest was in fungi. Morgan worked as a teacher in Dayton.  He studied the botany of the Great Miami River, publishing in 1878 the Flora of the Miami River, Ohio; Morgan also showed particular interest in mycology and bryology.  A.P. Morgan was a mentor to the prominent American mycologist Curtis Gates Lloyd. His correspondence with Lloyd is stored in the Lloyd Library and Museum in Cincinnati. Lloyds portion of the correspondence is stored in the Ada Hayden Herbarium at Iowa state university. Morgans collection of preserved fungi can also be found at the Ada Hayden Herbarium along with Laura Morgans gouache illustrations of fungi that could not be preserved.

Family 
Morgan married scientific illustrator and collector Laura Matilda Vail in 1870.

Taxa described
Astraeus Morgan (1889)
Bovistella Morgan (1892)
Marasmius delectans Morgan (1905)
Pyrenomyxa (1896)

Eponymous taxa 
Several fungal species have been named in Morgan's honor:
Agaricus morganii Peck 1879
Boletus morgani Peck 1883 (now Heimioporus betula)
Cantharellus morgani Peck (now Hygrophoropsis morganii)
Geastrum morganii Lloyd 1902
Hypoxylon morganii Ellis & Everh. 1892
Polyporus morgani Frost
Lepiota morgani Peck 1887 (now Chlorophyllum molybdites)
Marasmius morganianus Sumst. 1914
Morganella Zeller 1948
Peziza morganii Massee 1902
Physospora morganii Sacc. & Traverso 1911
Polyporus morganii Frost 1879 (now Polyporus radicatus)
Russula morganii Sacc. 1887
Stemonitis morganii Peck 1880
Steccherinum morganii Banker 1906 (now Steccherinum reniforme)
Trametes morganii Lloyd 1919
Xylaria morganii Lloyd 1924

In honor of his wife, Morgan named Hygrophorus laurae, currently known as Limacium laurae (Morgan) Singer.

Publications
Morgan, A.P. (1878). Flora of the Miami Valley, Ohio. The literary union.
Morgan, A.P. (1884) "The North American Geasters" in  American Naturalist 18:(10) 963–970
Morgan, A.P. (1887) "North American Agarics. -- The sub-genus Amanita" in  Journal of Mycology 3:(3) 25–33
Morgan, A.P. (1889) "North American Fungi. The Gasteromycetes: 1." in  Journal of the Cincinnati Society of Natural History 11: 141–149
Morgan, A.P. (1890). North American fungi. Third paper. The Gastromycetes. Order II. Lycoperdaceae (continued). Journal of the Cincinnati Society of Natural History 12 (4): 8, 163–168.
Morgan, A.P. (1892). Two new genera of hyphomycetes. Botanical Gazette 17: 190–192.
Morgan, A.P. (1892). North American helicosporae. Journal of the Cincinnati Society of Natural History 15: 39–52.
Morgan, A.P. (1892, publ. 1893). The myxomycetes of Miami Valley, Ohio. I. Journal of the Cincinnati Society of Natural History 15: 127–143.
Morgan, A.P. (1894). The myxomycetes of Miami Valley, Ohio. III. Journal of the Cincinnati Society of Natural History 16: 127–156.
Morgan, A.P. (1895). New North American fungi. Journal of the Cincinnati Society of Natural History 18: 36–45.
Morgan, A.P. (1896). The myxomycetes of Miami Valley, Ohio. IV. Journal of the Cincinnati Society of Natural History 19: 1-44.
Morgan, A.P. (1902). The discomycetes of the Miami Valley, Ohio. Journal of Mycology 8: 179–192.
Morgan, A.P. (1906). North American species of Heliomyces. Journal of Mycology 12: 92–95.
Morgan, A.P. (1906). North American species of Lepiota. Journal of Mycology 12: 154–159, 195–203, 242–248.

References

External links
 
 

1836 births
1907 deaths
American botanists